Kasautii Zindagii Kay is an Indian Hindi-language television series produced by Ekta Kapoor's Balaji Telefilms on Star Plus. The show starred Shweta Tiwari, Cezzane Khan later replaced by Hiten Tejwani, Ronit Roy and Urvashi Dholakia who portrayed Prerna Sharma, Anurag Basu, Rishabh Bajaj and Komolika Majumdar.
The show aired from 29 October 2001 to 28 February 2008. The whole series is digitally available on Disney+ Hotstar. The show was one of the most longest running television show of Star Plus.
                     
The show explored the story of the star crossed lovers Anurag and Prerna. The various stages of their love and life as well as the lives of their children and grandchildren.

Plot
Anurag and Prerna fall in love with each other, only for fate to time and again separate them. Komolika and Rishabh Bajaj are vital catalysts in the story. Over a span of sixty years in the show, the story revolves around Anurag, Prerna, and their children Prem, Sneha, and eventually progressing to their grandchildren.

Chapters

Cast

Main 

 Shweta Tiwari as Prerna Rishabh Bajaj (née: Sharma; formerly Basu)– Rajesh and Veena's eldest daughter; Shekhar, Shivani, Mitali and Mahesh's sister; Bajaj's Wife contractual ; Anurug's former wife; Prem, Sneha, Kasak's mother; Thushak, Vishaka, Cookie's stepmother. Jr. Prerna, Dhara and Rudraksh's grandmother. (2001-2008) 
 Cezanne Khan / Hiten Tejwani as Anurag Basu – Moloy and Mohini's son; Nivedita, Rakhi and Tapur's brother; Prerna's former husband Komolika and Aparana's ex-husband; Sampada's husband; Prem, Sneha father; Shravan's foster father; Jr. Prerna, Dhara and Rudraksh's grandfather. (2001-2008) 
 Urvashi Dholakia as Komolika Majumdar Basu – Uma's daughter; Subrato's wife; Anurag and Akash's ex-wife; Prem and Shravan's foster mother. (2001–2008)
Ronit Roy as Rishabh Bajaj – Mahesh's brother; Menka's husband; Prerna's husband; Vishakha, Tushar, Kukki, Tanisha and Kasak's father; Krithika, Tara, Jwala, Gargi, Kanishtha and Tanvi's grandfather. (2002-2008)

Recurring 

 Deepak Qazir as Moloy Basu – Pranay and Sanjay's brother; Mohini's husband; Rakhi, Nivedita, Anurag and Tapur's father; Prem, Diya, Sneha and Jr. Prem's grandfather (2001–2005)
 Kannu Gill as Mohini Basu – Moloy's widow; Rakhi, Nivedita, Anurag and Tapur's mother; Prem, Diya, Sneha and Jr. Prem's grandmother (2001–2008)
 Yatin Karyekar as Pranay Basu – Moloy and Sanjay's brother; Yamini's husband; Subroto, Anirudh and Kajol's father (2001-2003)
 Niyati Joshi as Yamini Basu – Pranay's wife; Subroto, Anirudh and Kajol's mother (2001-2006)
 Naveen Saini as Sanjay Basu – Moloy and Pranay's brother; Geeta's husband; Samay and Shulabh's father (2001-2005)
 Monica Pradhan / Jayati Bhatia as Geeta Basu – Sanjay's wife; Samay and Shulabh's mother (2001-2006)
 Poonam Narula / Smita Bansal as Nivedita Basu Sengupta – Moloy and Mohini's second daughter; Rakhi, Anurag and Tapur's sister; Anupam's wife (2001-2006)
 Prachi Thakker as Rakhi Basu Sengupta – Moloy and Mohini's eldest daughter; Nivedita, Anurag and Tapur's sister; Praveen's wife; Diya's mother (2001-2007)
 Aparna Jaywant as Tapur Basu – Moloy and Mohini's youngest daughter; Anurag, Nivedita and Rakhi's sister (2001-2002)
 Manish Goel / Hiten Paintal as Anupam Sengupta – Chaini's second son; Praveen and Indraneel's brother; Nivedita's husband (2001-2003) / (2006)
 Manav Gohil / Tarun Khanna as Praveen Sengupta – Chaini's eldest son; Anupam and Indraneel's brother; Rakhi's husband; Diya's father (2001-2004)
 Ankur Nayyar / Pracheen Chauhan / Prem Agarwal / Vishal Puri / Aashish Kaul as Subroto Basu – Pranay and Yamini's elder son; Anirudh and Kajol's brother; Shivani's ex-husband; Komolika's husband (2001-2006)
 Tasneem Sheikh / Prerna Shah as Kajol Basu Sharma – Pranay and Yamini's daughter; Anirudh and Subroto's sister; Mahesh's wife (2001-2003)
 Rushad Rana as Anirudh Basu – Pranay and Yamini's younger son; Subroto and Kajol's brother (2002)
 Hitesh Kriplani as Samay Basu – Sanjay and Geeta's elder son; Shulabh's brother (2001-2005)
 Om Bhanushali as Shulabh Basu – Sanjay and Geeta's younger son; Samay's brother (2001-2005)
 Nandita Thakur as Veena Sharma – Rajesh's wife; Shekhar, Prerna, Shivani, Mitali and Mahesh's mother (2001-2008)
 Manoj Pandey as Shekhar Sharma – Rajesh and Veena's elder son; Prerna, Shivani, Mitali and Mahesh's brother; Suman's husband (2001-2004)
 Kusumit Sana as Shivani Sharma – Rajesh and Veena's second daughter; Prerna, Shekhar, Mitali and Mahesh's sister; Subroto's former wife (2001-2003)
 Kishwer Merchant as Mitali Sharma – Rajesh and Veena's youngest daughter; Prerna, Shekhar, Shivani and Mahesh's sister (2001-2004)
 Shivani Gosain as Suman Sharma – Shekhar's wife (2001-2004)
 Mahesh Pandey as Mahesh Sharma – Rajesh and Veena's younger son; Prerna, Shekhar, Shivani, and Mitali's brother; Kajol's husband (2001-2004)
 Anand Suryavanshi / Vivek Mushran / Nasir Khan as Vineet Khanna – Anurag's business partner and best friend; Madhavi's husband; Tanisha's adoptive father (2002-2006)
 Sonal Sehgal / Vaishnavi Mahant as Advocate Madhavi Bose Khanna – Menaka's sister; Vineet's wife; Tanisha's mother (2004-2006)
 Poonam Joshi as Jyoti – Prerna's best friend (2001-2002)
 Sikandar Kharbanda as Indraneel Sengupta – Chaini's youngest son; Anupam and Praveen's brother; Komolika's spy (2002-2008)
 Himani Shivpuri as Chaini Sengupta – Praveen, Anupam and Indraneel's mother (2002-2003)
 Mini Ribeiro as Uma Majumdar – Komolika's mother (2002)
 Prashant Bhatt as Akash Dasgupta – Komolika's former husband (2002)
 Ruby Bhatia as Menaka Bose – Madhavi's sister; Rishabh's first wife; Tushar, Vishakha and Kukki's mother (2002-2003)
 Vishal Sabnani as Tushar Bajaj – Rishabh and Menaka's son; Vishakha and Kukki's brother; Tanisha and Kasak's half-brother; Doris's husband (2002-2008)
 Suzanne Bernert as Doris Bajaj – Tushar's wife (2006-2008)
 Tarana Raja / Preeti Puri / Amita Chandekar as Vishakha Bajaj – Rishabh and Menaka's elder daughter; Tushar and Kukki's sister; Tanisha and Kasak's half-sister; Taanvi's mother (2002-2007)
 Mansi Parekh / Garima Bhatnagar as Kokila 'Kukki' Bajaj – Rishabh and Menaka's younger daughter; Tushar and Vishakha's sister; Tanisha and Kasak's half-sister; Taanvi's adoptive mother (2004-2007)
 Swapnali Kulkarni as Child Kokila "Kukki" Bajaj (2002-2003)
 Geetanjali Tikekar as Aparna Ghosh – Anurag's ex-wife; Shravan's mother (2003-2007)
 Yash Tonk as Debo – Anurag's friend; Aparna's ex-husband; Shravan's father (2004)
 Unknown as Prem Basu – Anurag and Prerna's elder son; Sneha and Jr. Prem's brother; Kasak's half-brother (2002-2003) (Dead)
 Jennifer Winget as Sneha Basu Gill – Anurag and Prerna's daughter; Rishab's adopted daughter; Prem and Jr. Prem's sister; Kasak's half-sister; Sharad's ex-wife; Omi's wife; Jr. Prerna's mother. (2005-2007)
 Shriya Sharma as Child Sneha Basu (2004-2005)
 Karanvir Bohra / Vikas Sethi as Jr. Prem Basu – Anurag and Prerna's younger son; Prem and Sneha's brother; Kasak's half-brother; Devki and Palchin's husband; Dhara and Rudraksh's father (2005-2008)
 Rakshanda Khan as Advocate Dorasti – Lawyer (2005)
 Moonmoon Banerjee as Sampada Basu – Anurag's fourth wife (2005-2007)
 Amar Upadhyay / Sanjeet Bedi as Advocate Mahesh Bajaj – Rishabh's brother; Yuvraj's father (2005-2007)
 Sanjay Batra as Jeevan Deshmukh - Bajaj family's driver and Mukti's father (2005-2006)
 Tuhina Vohra as Devyana Garewal - Nihal's mother (2007-2008)
 Karan Singh Grover as Sharad Gupta - Sneha's ex-husband (2005-2006)
 Ravi Jhankal as Mr. Verma - Palchin's father (2007)
 Pratap Sachdev as Mr. Gupta - Bajaj's friend (2003-2007)
 Anju Mahendru as Kamini Gupta  - Sharad's mother (2005-2006)
 Amit Singh Thakur as Shailendra Gupta - Sharad's father (2005-2006)
 Karan Patel as Karan (2005-2006)
 Sai Deodhar as Debonita - Komolika's niece (2006)
 Jitendra Trehan as Baba - Sampada's father (2006-2007)
 Lucky Raajut as Lucky - Yudi's friend (2006)
 Navneet Nishan as Anahita Gill - Omi's aunt (2006-2007)
 Ankita Bhargava Patel as Shipra - Omi's girlfriend (2006)
 Sunny Nijar as Saksham - Jr. Prerna's love interest (2007) (Dead)
 Jatin Shah as Yuvraj Bajaj - Mahesh's son (2006)
 Prachi Desai as Prachi Chauhan - Gurukul's student (2007)
 Sandeep Baswana as Dr. Jatin - Devki's doctor (2007)
 Shabbir Ahluwalia as Omi Gill – Sneha's second husband; Jr. Prerna's father (2006-2007)
 Tina Parekh as 
 Mukti Deshmukh – Jeevan's daughter; Jr. Prem's love interest (2005-2006)
 Devki Basu – Mukti's lookalike; Jr. Prem's second wife; Rudraksh's mother (2006-2008)
 Shubhangi Atre / Monika Singh / Shriya Bisht as Palchin Verma Basu – Jr. Prem's ex-wife; Dhara's mother (2007-2008)
 Kratika Sengar as Jr. Prerna "P2" Gill Garewal – Sneha and Omi's daughter; Saksham's love interest; Nihal's wife (2007-2008)
 Naman Shaw as Nihal Garewal – Devyana's son; Jr. Prerna's husband (2007-2008)
 Wasna Ahmed as Dhara Basu Garewal – Jr. Prem and Palchin's daughter; Rudraksh's half-sister; Vardaan's wife (2007-2008)
 Mridul Sanghvi as Vardaan Garewal – Dhara's husband (2007-2008)
 Deepak Bajaj as Rudraksh Basu – Jr. Prem and Devki's son; Dhara's half-brother (2007-2008)
 Barkha Bisht as Diya Sengupta – Rakhi and Praveen's daughter; Prem, Sneha and Jr. Prem's cousin (2005)
 Abhinav Kapoor / Pradeep Kharab / Puneet Sachdev as Shravan Basu – Aparna and Debo's son; Anurag's adoptive son; Tanisha's husband; Kritika's father (2005-2007)
 Chintan Shah as Child Shravan Basu 
 Shubha Verma as Tanisha Khanna Basu – Rishab and Madhvi's daughter; Vinit's adoptive daughter; Vishaka, Tushar and Kukki's half-sister; Shravan's wife; Kritika's mother. (2005-2007)
 Gazala Selmin as Kritika Basu – Sharavan and Tanisha's daughter (2007-2008)
 Surveen Chawla / Parineeta Seth as Kasak Bajaj – Prerna and Rishab's daughter; Vishakha, Tushar, Kukki, Tanisha, Prem, Sneha and Jr. Prem's half-sister; Shravan's ex-fiancée; Kritika's surrogate mother (2005-2006) / (2007)
 Nidhi Uttam as Tara Bajaj – Tushar and Doris' eldest daughter; Jwala, Gargi and Kanishtha's sister (2007-2008)
 Praneeta Sahu as Jwala Bajaj – Tushar and Doris' second daughter; Tara, Gargi and Kanishtha's sister (2007-2008)
 Sreejita De as Gargi Bajaj – Tushar and Doris' third daughter; Tara, Jwala and Kanishtha's sister (2007-2008)
 Rudrakshi Shetty as Kanishtha Bajaj – Tushar and Doris' youngest daughter; Tara, Jwala and Gargi's sister (2007-2008)
 Shriya Parekh as Taanvi Bajaj - Visakha's daughter; Kukki's adoptive daughter (2007-2008)

Special appearances

Production

Development
Kapoor stated that Anurag was named after her director friend and Prerna was named after her father's friend Prem Chopra's daughter.

The series was filmed at sets in Killick Nixion studio, set number 7 B in Mumbai. In early 2003, a sequence was filmed at Australia.

In October 2003, the series had a crossover with Des Mein Niklla Hoga Chand.

In 2005, the series was filmed at Singapore and Malaysia (Episode 708 - Episode 721).

In 2007, Khan was replaced by Hiten Tejwani in the series.

Cancellation
In November 2007, Kasautii was confirmed going off-air in January 2008. However it ended on 28 February 2008 for which Kapoor stated, "I won't deny that the TRPs of Kasautii… had gone down quite a bit and moreover, I didn't have a story to tell."

Reboot series

A reboot of the show, also titled Kasautii Zindagii Kay, was aired on Star Plus from 25 September 2018 to 3 October 2020 for two years which did not sustain expected ratings unlike this series. This reboot has been remade in Kannada language on Star Suvarna titled Premloka.

Reception

Critics
Rediff.com stated, "One nice thing about Kasauti... is that all characters in the serial are very strong. Be it the protagonists or antagonists, every character stands on firm ground."

Ratings
Kasautii Zindagii Kay became the third-longest running and top rated Hindi GEC series after Kyunki Saas Bhi Kabhi Bahu Thi and Kahaani Ghar Ghar Kii— all three of which were produced by Balaji Telefilms. The show recorded one of the highest TRPs helping StarPlus maintaining its top position.

It began with an average ratings of 4.44 while in 2002, 2003, 2004 it grows to an average TRP of 7.51, 8.83 and 9.14 respectively. Kasautii garnering 9.9 TVR as on 18 November 2003 at third position. The crossover episode between Des Mein Niklla Hoga Chand and Kasautii during October 2003 garnered 14+ TVR.

While in 2005, it maintained its third position with 10.93 TVR while the following year it dropped 8.78 TVR despite maintaining its position.

In second week of January 2007, Kasautii continued to be third with a declined rating of 5.6 TVR.

Being one of the top-rated Indian television series maintaining its position in top 10 programs until 2008, it dropped to eleventh position in January 2008 after which it was soon cancelled.

Awards

Soundtrack
The Kasautii Zindagii Kay soundtrack is from the Indian soap opera that has recorded more than fifty tracks during its airing from 2001 to 2008 and won several awards.

The show had recorded more than a hundred tracks including some versions of Bollywood hit songs Kya Pyaar Karoge Mujhse, Ajeeb Dastan Hai Yeh, Hum Bewafa Hargiz Na Thay, Kal Ho Naa Ho, Jiyen To Jiyen Kaisy and Do Ajnabi Kidar Ja Rahy Hain.

Original serial versions

References

External links
 
 Kasautii Zindagii Kay on Hotstar
  (Star TV)

Balaji Telefilms television series
Kasautii Zindagii Kay
Indian television soap operas
StarPlus original programming
2001 Indian television series debuts
2008 Indian television series endings
Television shows set in Kolkata